Ectonucleoside triphosphate diphosphohydrolase 2 is an enzyme that in humans is encoded by the ENTPD2 gene.

The protein encoded by this gene is the type 2 enzyme of the ecto-nucleoside triphosphate diphosphohydrolase family (E-NTPDase). E-NTPDases are a family of ecto-nucleosidases that hydrolyze 5'-triphosphates. This ecto-ATPase is an integral membrane protein. Alternative splicing of this gene results in multiple transcript variants.

It has been shown, by scientists from the University of Warwick, that E-NTPDase2 stimulates the growth of the eye: by testing the enzyme on tadpoles, the tadpoles were found to develop extra eyes on their body.

References

Further reading

Enzymes